is a Japanese curler from Sapporo, Hokkaido. She is the skip of the FORTIUS curling team, which won the Japan Curling Championships in both 2015 and 2021.

Career
Yoshimura made her international debut for Japan at the 2006 Pacific Junior Curling Championships, playing lead for Team Japan, skipped by Megumi Kobayashi. They would win a silver medal after losing in the final to China's Wang Bingyu. In 2009, her junior team competed in the qualification round for the 2010 Winter Olympics, but lost in the first round to Team Nagano. Yoshimura did not return to the Pacific Juniors until 2011, when she skipped Japan to a gold medal at the 2011 Pacific Junior Curling Championships, qualifying her nation for the 2011 World Junior Curling Championships. There, she led Japan to a 3–6 record, finishing in eighth place. Also during the 2010–11 season, she skipped Japan at the 2011 Winter Universiade. There, she led her team to a 6–3 round robin record, qualifying for the playoffs. They then lost both of their playoff games, settling for fourth.

Yoshimura once again led Japan to a gold medal at the 2012 Pacific-Asia Junior Curling Championships. After a 6–2 record in the round robin, her team beat South Korea's Kim Eun-jung 3–2 in the championship final. This win qualified her team for the 2012 World Junior Curling Championships where they lost in a tiebreaker to Sweden's Sara McManus. She won another gold medal for Japan at the 2013 Pacific-Asia Junior Curling Championships, losing only one game en route to claiming the title. She would then finally make the podium at the World Juniors, leading Japan to bronze medal at the 2013 World Junior Curling Championships. After the round robin, her team of Rina Ida, Risa Ujihara and Mao Ishigaki were in second place with a 6–3 record. However, they lost both the 1 vs. 2 page playoff and semifinal games before beating Czech Republic's Zuzana Hájková in the bronze medal game. Also that season, they reached the semifinals of the Karuizawa International.

One year out of juniors, her team stuck together and played at the 2013 Winter Universiade. There, they started with wins in three of their first four games before losing their last five games, finishing in a disappointing seventh place. Team Yoshimura also competed in the national trials for the 2013 Olympic Qualification Event for the chance to represent Japan at the 2014 Winter Olympics. They finished the event with a 2–4 record, however, were able to beat the eventual champions Hokkaido Bank (Ayumi Ogasawara) in their opening match. On tour, they finished runner-up at the 2013 Medicine Hat Charity Classic to Russia's Anna Sidorova rink.

After the season, Yoshimura joined the Ogasawara Hokkaido Bank rink at third, who were the top ranked team in Japan at the time. The team also included Kaho Onodera at second, Anna Ohmiya at lead and Yumie Funayama as the alternate. On the World Curling Tour, they would win two events, the Prestige Hotels & Resorts Curling Classic and the Hub International Crown of Curling. They represented Japan at the 2014 Pacific-Asia Curling Championships, Yoshimura's first appearance at the championship. After a 5–3 round robin record, they lost to China's Liu Sijia in the semifinal. They were, however, able to pick up the bronze medal against New Zealand's Chelsea Farley. This would ordinarily not be enough to qualify Japan for the World Championships, but because Sapporo was hosting the event, Japan qualified for the 2015 World Women's Curling Championship. The team then competed in their national championship to determine who would represent Japan at the World Championship. After the round robin, they placed second with a 7–1 record, but defeated Loco Solare (Mari Motohashi) to qualify for the final where they once again played Motohashi. The team were successful in securing the national title by defeating Loco Solare 8–5 and qualifying for the World Championship, Yoshimura's first Worlds. There, they placed just outside of the tiebreakers with a 6–5 record, ending in sixth place.

Team Ogasawara won one tour event during the 2015–16 season, the Karuizawa International, where they lost only one game en route to claiming the title. They also had semifinal appearances at the Colonial Square Ladies Classic, the Crestwood Ladies Fall Classic and the City of Perth Ladies International. The team played in the 2016 Continental Cup of Curling where they were part of the losing Team World squad. In February 2016, they competed in the Japan Curling Championships, attempting to defend their title. They had a strong round robin, going an undefeated 8–0, but then lost both of their playoff games to Loco Solare (Satsuki Fujisawa) and Fujikyu (Tori Koana), settling for third. They also played in the 2016 Humpty's Champions Cup, the team's first Grand Slam event. They would finish the round robin as the number one seed with a 4–0 record before losing in the quarterfinals to Switzerland's Silvana Tirinzoni.

The team altered their lineup for the 2016–17 season, moving Yoshimura to alternate and Yumie Funayama to third. At the start of the season, Team Ogasawara finished runner-up at the Royal LePage Women's Fall Classic to the Robyn MacPhee rink. They played in one grand slam, the 2016 Tour Challenge, losing in a tiebreaker to Anna Hasselborg. At the national championship, they went 6–2 through the round robin before losing both the semifinal and bronze medal games, settling for fourth. The next season was more successful for the team, reaching the semifinals in five of their eleven tour events. They were not able to make it further than the semifinals in any of their events, however. They did not have the opportunity to compete to represent Japan at the 2018 Winter Olympics as only the Fujisawa and Chiaki Matsumura rinks were selected to compete in the 2017 Japanese Olympic Curling Trials. At the 2018 Japan Curling Championships, they went 7–1 through the round robin and once again won the 1 vs. 2 page playoff game to qualify for the final. There, they faced Koana's Fujikyu rink. Tied 3–3 with the hammer in the tenth end, Ogasawara missed her last shot and the team gave up a steal of two and the win to the Koana rink. Following the season, Ogasawara stepped away from competitive curling.

For the 2018–19 season, Yoshimura stepped up to skip the team with Onodera at third, Ohmiya at second and Funayama as lead. The team would have immediate success on the tour, winning the 2018 Oakville Fall Classic. The team played in three Slams over the course of the season, the 2018 Tour Challenge Tier 2, the 2018 National and 2019 Players' Championship. Despite missing the playoffs at the National and Players' Championship, the team made it all the way to the final of the Tour Challenge Tier 2 where they were defeated by the Elena Stern rink. They also had three runner-up finishes at the Colonial Square Ladies Classic, the 2018 Paf Masters Tour and the Karuizawa International. At the 2019 Japan Curling Championships, Yoshimura led her team to a fourth place 5–3 record in the round robin. They were then able to defeat Fujikyu in the 3 vs. 4 game but were eliminated by Loco Solare in the semifinal, earning the bronze medal.

Team Yoshimura had a slow start to the 2019–20 season, only qualifying for the playoffs in three of their first eight events. They reached the semifinals of the 2019 Cargill Curling Training Centre Icebreaker and the quarterfinals of both the 2019 AMJ Campbell Shorty Jenkins Classic and the KW Fall Classic. They would find success at the first Grand Slam event of the season, however, reaching the playoffs of the 2019 Masters with a 3–1 record. They would then upset higher ranked teams Jennifer Jones and Silvana Tirinzoni before losing to Tracy Fleury in the final. It marked the first time an Asian team made it to a grand slam final, excluding defunct events. The team would not qualify in any of the three other Slams they participated in during the season, the 2019 Tour Challenge, the 2019 National or the 2020 Canadian Open. They once again finished third at the 2020 Japan Curling Championships after a semifinal loss to Chubu Electric Power (Seina Nakajima). The Japanese championship would be their last event of the season as both the Players' Championship and the Champions Cup Grand Slam events were also cancelled due to the pandemic.

Team Yoshimura played in no World Curling Tour events during the abbreviated 2020–21 season as there were no events held in Japan or Asia. The team would compete in their national championship, held from February 7 to 14, 2021 in Wakkanai, Hokkaido. The team posted a 5–1 record through the round robin of the national championship, earning them a spot in the 1 vs. 2 page playoff game. There, the lost to Loco Solare, but beat Chubu Electric Power in the semifinal to qualify for the final. Down one in the tenth, Team Yoshimura scored two points to win the national championship 7–6 over Team Fujisawa. The win marked the teams second time winning the national title in over six years. It also earned them the right to represent Japan at the 2021 World Women's Curling Championship, which was played in a bio-secure bubble in Calgary, Canada due the ongoing pandemic. At the Worlds, Yoshimura led her team to a 5–8 record, finishing in eleventh place.

In September 2021, the team competed in the 2021 Japanese Olympic Curling Trials, which were held in a best-of-five contest between the Yoshimura and Satsuki Fujisawa rinks. After winning the first two games, Team Yoshimura lost the final three games of the trials, not earning the right to represent Japan at the 2021 Olympic Qualification Event. They played in one Slam at the 2021 Masters where they went a winless 0–3 in the triple knockout bracket. They were, however, still able to represent Japan at the 2021 Pacific-Asia Curling Championships due to winning the 2021 national championship. There, they went 5–1 through the round robin, earning a direct bye to the final were they faced South Korea's Kim Eun-jung. Down one in the tenth, Team Yoshimura was once again able to score a deuce to win the game 6–5 and earn the gold medal. Because Team Fujisawa won the Olympic Trials series and were representing Japan at the 2022 Winter Olympics, a world championship trial was held between Hokkaido Bank Fortius, Chubu Electric Power and Fujikyu to determine who would represent Japan at the 2022 World Women's Curling Championship. Hokkaido Bank posted a 3–1 record in the qualifying round, earning them a spot in the best-of-three final against Nakajima. After splitting the first two games, the Nakajima rink took one in the tenth end of the final game to earn the berth as Team Japan at the World Championship. Team Yoshimura ended their season at the 2022 Japan Curling Championships. After a 4–4 round robin record, they lost in the 3 vs. 4 page playoff game to Chubu Electric Power. Also during the 2021–22 season, the team's contract expired with Hokkaido Bank. They then formed their own team named Fortius.

In their first event of the 2022–23 season, Team Yoshimura won the 2022 Hokkaido Bank Curling Classic.

Personal life
Yoshimura attended Tokoro High School and Sapporo International University. She is married and is employed as an officer worker.

Grand Slam record
Yoshimura set a record at the 2019 Masters, being the first women's team from Asia to make a Grand Slam final, excluding inactive events.

Former events

Teams

References

External links

Fortius, Official Website

Japanese female curlers
Living people
1992 births
Pacific-Asian curling champions
Japanese curling champions
People from Kitami, Hokkaido
Sportspeople from Sapporo
20th-century Japanese women
21st-century Japanese women